Panama sent a delegation to compete at the 2008 Summer Paralympics in Beijing, People's Republic of China. It consisted of runner Said Gomez and swimmer Desirée Aguilar. Their results are detailed below.

Visually impaired runner Said Gomez was making his fifth appearance at the Paralympics, having competed continuously since Panama's first participation in the Paralympics in 1992. He had, over the previous Games, won a total of eight medals, of which three gold, which constituted the totality of Panama's Paralympic medals. The Beijing Games were the first at which he failed to win a medal.

Athletics

Men

Swimming

Women

See also
Panama at the Paralympics
Panama at the 2008 Summer Olympics

References

External links
International Paralympic Committee

Nations at the 2008 Summer Paralympics
2008
Summer Paralympics